"Other Side of Love" is a song by Jamaican recording artist Sean Paul from his sixth studio album Full Frequency. It was released on 10 September 2013 as a digital download. The song was written by Sean Paul, Benny Blanco, The Cataracs, and it was produced by the latter two.

Charts

Weekly charts

Year-end charts

Certifications

Release history

References

2013 singles
2013 songs
Sean Paul songs
Songs written by Sean Paul
Songs written by Benny Blanco
Song recordings produced by Benny Blanco
Song recordings produced by the Cataracs
Songs written by Kshmr